The Montana Golden Nuggets are a former Continental Basketball Association team that played from 1980 to 1983. They played their home games at Four Seasons Arena in Great Falls. 

Montana reached the CBA finals in 1981 and 1983, with George Karl earning Coach of the Year honors both seasons. Karl's 1980-81 team, led by John Douglas, Phil Taylor, Willie Smith and Geoff Crompton, went 27–15. The Nuggets met a high scoring Rochester team in the championship, where they were swept, four games to none. 

The club went 30–16 the next season with a roster featuring Ronnie Valentine, Walter Jordan, U.S. Reed, Robert Smith, Kenny Dennard and Terry Stotts, but lost in the conference finals to in-state rival the Billings Volcanos. A return to the championship marked the 1983 season, the team's last. Montana lost to Detroit in the league finals, four games to three. In late 2006, the "Electric City" saw the return of the CBA in the form of the Great Falls Explorers.

See also
Billings RimRockers
Butte Daredevils
Great Falls Explorers

External links
Montana Golden Nuggets Roster and Results on JustSportsStats.com
Photographs here and here by Larry Mayer for the Billings Gazette

Continental Basketball Association teams
Basketball teams established in 1980
Sports clubs disestablished in 1983
Basketball teams in Montana
1980 establishments in Montana
1983 disestablishments in Montana
Sports in Great Falls, Montana